Golly of Golly Community is a town in De Witt County, Texas.  In 2000 the population was 41

References

Geography of DeWitt County, Texas
Ghost towns in Texas